Kemal "Kem" Izzet (born 29 September 1980) is an English football coach and former professional player. He most notably played for Colchester United between 2001 and 2013, where he made over 400 league appearances. He was previously on the books at Charlton Athletic but failed to break into the first-team setup at The Valley. He spent three years with Needham Market after leaving Colchester.

Playing career

Charlton Athletic
Izzet started his career with Premier League club Charlton Athletic. He did not break into the first team at Charlton. He had previously played for London-based Sunday league side Senrab alongside Jermain Defoe, Ledley King, Jlloyd Samuel, John Terry and Bobby Zamora.

Colchester United
In April 2001, he joined Colchester United on a permanent basis after a one-month loan period. Later that year, he was linked with Ipswich Town and Leicester City but was happy to stay with Colchester, and signed a long-term contract with the club in March 2002. Izzet missed most of the 2004–05 season owing to an ankle injury that required surgery. He recovered for the 2005–06 season and was a key member of the team that challenged for promotion that season. He signed a new contract in March 2006 and, after lengthy negotiations, a contract extension in January 2008. At that time, he was the club's second longest serving player. By the end of the 2008–09 season, Izzet had made over 330 league and cup appearances for Colchester. Izzet was twice named the club's Young Player of the Year. He was inducted into Colchester's Hall of Fame in 2011 prior to the final game of the season for his testimonial year. On 3 July 2012, Izzet signed a new contract, having made over 400 league appearances since signing in 2001 and having just played his testimonial season.

Izzet brought an end to his 12-year stay with Colchester on 2 September 2013, leaving the club by mutual consent. He left the club having received his testimonial in 2012 and a runners-up medal from the club's promotion to the Championship in 2006. Having failed to make an appearance for the first-team in the 2013–14 season, Izzet decided to end his long association with the U's in order to look for regular football at a new club.

Needham Market
After leaving Colchester, Izzet joined local Isthmian League Division One North club Needham Market on 10 September, beginning his time with the club on the bench alongside fellow ex-U's player Jamie Guy. Izzet signed despite interest from Football League clubs including Exeter City, instead choosing to invest his financial settlement agreed with Colchester after ending his contract in setting up a football school business, with help from financial advisor and Needham Market manager Mark Morsley. Izzet was also studying towards his UEFA B Licence in the latter stages of his Colchester career and continued working toward coaching badge with Needham. After making 120 appearances and scoring 16 goals, Izzet left the club after his role as academy manager was effectively removed following restructuring.

Managerial career
In May 2017, Izzet was appointed manager of Eastern Counties League club Stanway Rovers. At the end of the 2017–18 season, Izzet left Stanway. He was appointed manager of Brightlingsea Regent in October 2019. He left Brightlingsea Regent in October 2020, seven games into the 2020–21 season.

Personal life
Izzet's father is a Turkish Cypriot, and his elder brother, Muzzy Izzet, was a Turkish international footballer.

Career statistics

A.  The "Other" column constitutes appearances and goals (including those as a substitute) in the Football League Trophy, FA Trophy, .

References

External links

1980 births
Living people
Footballers from Mile End
English footballers
Turkish footballers
Sportspeople of Turkish Cypriot descent
English people of Turkish Cypriot descent
English people of Turkish descent
Turkish people of English descent
Association football midfielders
Senrab F.C. players
Charlton Athletic F.C. players
Colchester United F.C. players
Needham Market F.C. players
Stanway Rovers F.C. managers
Brightlingsea Regent F.C. managers
English Football League players
English football managers